Rob. A! (born Robert Lamont Allen) is an American singer-songwriter and record producer. He is popular for his freestyle songwriting approach that gave him the nickname "The Jay-Z of R&B".

He got his break as a songwriter in early 2008 when he collaborated with Andre Merritt, Chris Brown and Brian Kennedy. The collaboration climbed him to a multi-platinum songwriter status with two No. 1 records back to back in June 2009.

By the end of the summer of 2009, he was signed a co-publishing deal with Sony/ATV Music Publishing courtesy of the VP/Urban A&R Juan Madrid.

Rob Allen, who is also referred to by Twitter followers as King Rebel, has started the movement called the Robellion. He explains:  "It is my effort to reset the tone of the music business. I want to pave a way for true talent and creativity to be noticed. Music has now become packaged and mechanical with the exception of the veterans who have total freedom in their art. The variety of unique voices and character is missing and I'm going to bring that back."  Behind the Robellion is his own team, called Team Rebel. He is currently working with producer Donameche "Don-City" Jackson. Together they have made leaked songs "Pressin' Buttons," "Curves," "Wifey Material," "Beat It Up" and "Kill Cupid."

Songwriting credits

2008
 Rihanna — Disturbia
 01. "Disturbia" (co-written by Rob. A!, Chris Brown, Andre Merritt and Brian Kennedy)

 Chris Brown — Exclusive
 18. "Forever" (co-written by Rob. A!, Chris Brown, and Polow da Don)
  
Other Songs written by Rob.A

[Chris Brown]

Forever
Dreamer
Erased [Andre Merritt]
Electric Guitar
Hologram [Andre Merritt]
Golden Girl
Froze
Trapped in a Dream
Without You
Spirit
Powerful
You Need
Famous Girl [Graffiti]
What i Do [Graffiti]
I need This [Graffiti]
Glow in The Dark [In My Zone]
Seen her naked [In My Zone 2]
Captive
Nasty Girl

Others
Omarion "Comfort", J. Holiday "Heart Attack", Kelly Rowland "On & On", R. Kelly "I Love the Dj", Jaicko "Two Piece", Sugababes "Sweet and Amazing", Mario "Need to Be There"

Awards

Teen Choice Awards

|-
| align="center" | 2008 || Forever || Teen Choice Awards: Best R&B Track|| 
|-

People's Choice Award

|-
| align="center" | 2009 || Disturbia || People's Choice Award: Favorite Pop Song || 
|-

Grammy Award

|-
| align="center" | 2009 || Disturbia || Grammy Award: Best Dance Recording || 
|-

NRJ Music Award

|-
| align="center" | 2009 || Disturbia || NRJ Music Award: International Song of the Year || 
|-

MTV Awards

|-
| align="center" | 2008 || Forever || MTV Video Music Awards: Best Video of the Year || 
|-
| align="center"| 2009 || Forever || MTV Australia Awards for Best Moves || 
|-

BMI Pop Award

|-
| align="center" | 2009 || Forever || BMI Pop Award || 
|-
| align="center"| 2010 || Disturbia || BMI Pop Award || 
|-

References

External links
 Official Rob. A Website
 Rob. A on Twitter

1985 births
Living people
American male singer-songwriters
Place of birth missing (living people)
21st-century American singers
21st-century American male singers
Singer-songwriters from New Jersey